The Canton of Beuzeville is a canton of the département of Eure, in France. At the French canton reorganisation which came into effect in March 2015, the canton was expanded from 16 to 62 communes (2 of which were merged into the new commune Le Mesnil-Saint-Jean):

 Asnières
 Bailleul-la-Vallée
 Barville
 Bazoques
 Berville-sur-Mer
 Beuzeville
 Le Bois-Hellain
 Boissy-Lamberville
 Boulleville
 Bournainville-Faverolles
 La Chapelle-Bayvel
 La Chapelle-Hareng
 Conteville
 Cormeilles
 Drucourt
 Duranville
 Épaignes
 Épreville-en-Lieuvin
 Fatouville-Grestain
 Le Favril
 Fiquefleur-Équainville
 Folleville
 Fontaine-la-Louvet
 Fort-Moville
 Foulbec
 Fresne-Cauverville
 Giverville
 Heudreville-en-Lieuvin
 La Lande-Saint-Léger
 Lieurey
 Manneville-la-Raoult
 Martainville
 Le Mesnil-Saint-Jean
 Morainville-Jouveaux
 Noards
 La Noë-Poulain
 Piencourt
 Les Places
 Le Planquay
 La Poterie-Mathieu
 Saint-Aubin-de-Scellon
 Saint-Benoît-des-Ombres
 Saint-Christophe-sur-Condé
 Saint-Étienne-l'Allier
 Saint-Georges-du-Vièvre
 Saint-Germain-la-Campagne
 Saint-Grégoire-du-Vièvre
 Saint-Maclou
 Saint-Mards-de-Fresne
 Saint-Martin-Saint-Firmin
 Saint-Pierre-de-Cormeilles
 Saint-Pierre-des-Ifs
 Saint-Pierre-du-Val
 Saint-Siméon
 Saint-Sulpice-de-Grimbouville
 Saint-Sylvestre-de-Cormeilles
 Saint-Vincent-du-Boulay
 Le Theil-Nolent
 Thiberville
 Le Torpt
 Vannecrocq 

Beuzeville itself is about 10 miles from Honfleur, and 18 miles from Deauville. It has the sea to the North, and the Seine estuary to the East. Although just outside the département of Calvados, the production of the apple brandy known as Calvados is also produced there, and is the reason for the many apple orchards which are a distinguishing characteristic of the surrounding countryside. Agriculture and tourism are the main industries.

References

Beuzeville